The 2006–07 season saw FC Utrecht's compete in the Eredivise where they finished in 9th position with 48 points. They entered the end of season play-offs where they won the UEFA Intertoto Cup ticket after beating Vitesse Arnhem.

Final league table

Results

Legend

Eredivisie

UEFA Cup play-offs

UEFA Intertoto Cup play-off

KNVB Cup

Squad statistics

External links
 Utrecht 2006–07 at Voetbal International
 Squad numbers at footballsquads.co.uk

FC Utrecht seasons
FC Utrecht